The Solemnity of Mary, the Holy Mother of God is a feast day of the Blessed Virgin Mary under the aspect of her motherhood of Jesus Christ, whom she had circumcised on the eighth day after his birth according to Levitical Law. Christians see him as the Lord and Son of God.

It is celebrated by the Roman Rite of the Catholic Church on 1 January, the Octave (8th) day of Christmas. This solemnity is a Holy Day of Obligation in areas that have not abrogated it.  Christians of Byzantine, West Syriac, and East Syriac Rites celebrate Mary as the Mother of God on 26 December (also known as the Synaxis of the Theotokos), while the Coptic Church (an Oriental Orthodox church) does so on 16 January.

The Eastern Orthodox Church, Traditional Catholics, Anglican Communion and the Lutheran Church observe the Feast of the Circumcision of Christ on 1 January.

Significance 
The feast is a celebration of Mary being the mother of Jesus. The English title "Mother of God" is a literal translation of the Latin title Mater Dei, which in turn is a rendering of the Greek title Θεοτόκος (Theotokos), meaning "Bearer of God" dogmatically adopted by the First Council of Ephesus (431) as an assertion of the divinity of Christ.

History 
The Second Vatican Council stated: "Clearly from earliest times the Blessed Virgin is honoured under the title of Mother of God." and at an early stage the Church in Rome celebrated on 1 January a feast that it called the anniversary (Natale) of the Mother of God.

In the 13th or 14th century, 1 January began to be celebrated in Rome, as already in Spain and Gaul, as the feast of the Circumcision of the Lord and the Octave of the Nativity, while still oriented towards Mary and Christmas, with many prayers, antiphons and responsories glorifying the maternity of Mary. Pope John XXIII's General Roman Calendar of 1960 removed the mention of the circumcision of Jesus and called 1 January simply the Octave of the Nativity.

Feast of the Maternity of the Blessed Virgin Mary
The feast of the Maternity of the Blessed Virgin Mary was first granted, on the petition of King Joseph I of Portugal, to the dioceses of Portugal and to Brasil and Algeria, 22 January 1751, together with the feast of the Purity of Mary, and was assigned to the first Sunday in May. In the following year both feasts were extended to the province of Venice, in 1778 to the kingdom of Naples, and 1807 to Tuscany. In the Roman Breviary the feast of the Maternity was commemorated on the second, and the feast of the Purity on the third, Sunday in October. At Mesagna in Apulia it was kept 20 February in commemoration of the earthquake, 20 February 1743. This particular feast was not included in the universal calendar of the church, but a number of diocesan calendars had adopted it. By 1914, the feast was established in Portugal for celebration on 11 October and was extended to the entire Catholic Church by Pope Pius XI in 1931.

Madonna del Parto
In Rome, in the Basilica of S. Augustine, the feast of the "Maternity of the Blessed Virgin Mary" was celebrated with an octave, in honour of the miraculous statue of the Madonna del Parto by Jacopo Sansovino. For centuries, the people of Rome and its environs have invoked the intercession of the Madonna before this statue asking for safe deliveries and healthy babies. The statue is laden with thank-offerings and always surrounded by offerings of flowers and candles, and often photographs of smiling infants and toddlers, "visual evidence of faith in holy intercession".

Our Lady of Good Remedy
This feast was also the titular feast of the Trinitarians. In 1198, John of Matha founded the Order of the Most Holy Trinity with the mission of ransoming captive Christians. To this end, he placed the order's fund-raising efforts under the patronage of Mary. In gratitude for her assistance, he then honored Mary with the title of "Our Lady of Good Remedy" (also known under the invocation of Nuestra Señora de los Remedios). Her feast day is now celebrated on 8 October.

Mysterii Paschalis 
The 1969 revision of the liturgical year and the calendar in the Roman Rite states: "1 January, the Octave Day of the Nativity of the Lord, is the Solemnity of Mary, the Holy Mother of God, and also the commemoration of the conferral of the Most Holy Name of Jesus." It removed the 11 October feast, even for Portugal, stating: "The Maternity of the Blessed Virgin Mary is celebrated on 1 January in the Solemnity of Mary, the Mother of God." The 11 October feast is celebrated by Traditionalist Catholic individuals and groups who mostly observe the General Roman Calendar of 1960.

Marialis Cultus 

In his Apostolic Letter Marialis Cultus, Pope Paul VI explained: "This celebration, placed on January 1 ...is meant to commemorate the part played by Mary in this mystery of salvation. It is meant also to exalt the singular dignity which this mystery brings to the 'holy Mother...through whom we were found worthy to receive the Author of life.' It is likewise a fitting occasion for renewing adoration of the newborn Prince of Peace, for listening once more to the glad tidings of the angels (cf. ), and for imploring from God, through the Queen of Peace, the supreme gift of peace."

See also 
 Feast of the Circumcision of Christ
 Madonna del Parto as an iconic motif
 Mother of God (Roman Catholic)

References

Sources

External links 
 Saints of January 1 

January observances
December observances
Catholic Mariology
Christmastide
Marian feast days
Eastern Orthodox liturgical days
New Year's Day